Ramkan Rural District is a rural district (dehestan) in the Central District of Qeshm County, Hormozgan Province, Iran. At the 2006 census, its population was 13,472, in 2,815 families. The rural district has 14 villages.

References 

Rural Districts of Hormozgan Province
Qeshm County